The Central Balkan National Park lies in the heart of Bulgaria, nestled in the central and higher portions of the Balkan Mountains. Its altitude varies from 550 m. near the town of Karlovo to 2376 m. at Botev Peak, the highest summit in the mountain range. It was established on 31 October 1991. The Central Balkan National Park is the third largest protected territory in Bulgaria, spanning an area of 716.69 km² with total length of 85 km from the west to the east and an average width of 10 km. It occupies territory from 5 of the 28 provinces of the country: Lovech, Gabrovo, Sofia, Plovdiv and Stara Zagora. The national park includes nine nature reserves covering 28% of its territory: Boatin, Tsarichina, Kozya Stena, Steneto, Severen Dzhendem, Peeshti Skali, Sokolna, Dzhendema and Stara Reka.

The Central Balkan National Park is one of the largest and most valuable of the protected areas in Europe. The International Union for Conservation of Nature  (IUCN) has listed the Park as Category 2. The national park and eight of the nine nature reserves are on the UN list of Representative Protected Areas, and four of the nature reserves are included in the World Network of Biosphere Reserves under the UNESCO Man and Biosphere Programme. It is a full member of the WWF-led PAN Parks. Since 2017, the ancient beech forests within all nine park reserves have been included in the Primeval Beech Forests World Heritage Site.

The park falls within the Rodope montane mixed forests terrestrial ecoregion of the Palearctic temperate broadleaf and mixed forest. It is home of rare and endangered wildlife species and communities, self-regulating ecosystems of biological diversity, as well as historical sites of global cultural and scientific significance. The flora is represented by 2340 species and subspecies of plants. Forests occupy 56% of the total area. There are 59 species of mammals, 224 species of birds, 14 species of reptiles, 8 species of amphibia and 6 species of fish, as well as 2387 species of invertebrates.

History

The Central Balkan National Park was established in 1991 to conserve the unique natural scenery and heritage of this area and protect the customs and livelihood of the local population. The Park Directorate, a regional body of the Ministry of the Environment and Waters manages the Park. The Directorate engages local organizations, volunteers, and mountain enthusiasts in pursuing its goals.

Park statistics

 Area: 71,669.5 hectares
 Total length: 85 km
 Average width: 10 km
 Highest peak: Botev at 2,376 meters above sea level
 Lowest elevation: near Karlovo, about 500 meters above sea level
 Wooded area: 44,000.8 hectares
 Treeless area: 27,668.7 hectares
 70% of all ecosystems are natural
 There are 9 nature reserves, with a combined area of 20,019 hectares

Ecosystems

Centuries-old forests of beech, spruce, fir, hornbeam, and durmast oak cover most of the Park. More than half the flora of Bulgaria has been identified within the Park, and of these, 10 species and 2 subspecies are endemic, and are found nowhere else in the world. Over 130 higher plants and animals encountered in the Central Balkan National Park are listed in the Bulgarian and the World Red Book of Endangered Species.

There are 166 known species of medicinal plants, 12 are protected by law. In addition, there are 229 species of moss, 256 species of mushrooms, and 208 species of algae. The central portion of the Balkan Range is home to 70% of all invertebrate organisms and 62% of all vertebrate animals in Bulgaria. There are 224 separate species of birds, making the Central Balkan National Park an important, international bird refuge.

The EU-funded CORINE BIOTOPS Project created a habitat classification methodology and 49 of the CORINE classified types of habitats are represented in the Central Balkan National Park. Of these, 24 are included on the 'List of Endangered Habitats', requiring special protection measures pursuant to the EU Convention on Habitats.

Terrain

The Park terrain includes large high-mountain meadows, vertical rock faces, precipices, deep canyons, waterfalls, as well as numerous peaks, of which some 20 are situated at altitudes of 2,000 meters and over. The Central Balkan National Park is a favorite spot for tourists, naturalists, and scientists alike.

References

External links

Central Balkan National Park - Official web site
Central Balkan National Park Photo Gallery
 Central Balkan National Park Image Gallery

National parks of Bulgaria
Biosphere reserves of Bulgaria
Balkan mountains
Protected areas established in 1991
Geography of Gabrovo Province
Tourist attractions in Gabrovo Province
Geography of Lovech Province
Tourist attractions in Lovech Province
Geography of Stara Zagora Province
Tourist attractions in Stara Zagora Province
Geography of Plovdiv Province
Tourist attractions in Plovdiv Province
Geography of Sofia Province
Tourist attractions in Sofia Province
1991 establishments in Bulgaria
Primeval Beech Forests in Europe